This is a list of notable Methodist churches, either of notable congregations or of notable buildings or other places of worship. This very limited list reflects historically interesting sites, and omits most of the very largest Methodist congregations. Since the founding of Methodism in the mid-18th century, the movement has spread throughout the world, and remains a presence in many countries today.

Many church buildings are notable for their historical or architectural significance. Many of the historic churches can be found in the United Kingdom and the United States, but some are also located in Canada, China, Korea and other in countries where there has been a Methodist presence. In some cases the congregation which established the church has since disbanded but the building remains. This list is intended to comprehensively index notable Methodist churches world-wide.

Australia

Barbados
Ann Gill Memorial Methodist Church, in Fairfield Road, Black Rock, St. Michael, honours the memory of Sarah Ann Gill, the sole female national heroine of Barbados.

Canada
Two British Methodist Episcopal Church churches have been designated National Historic Sites of Canada due to their roles in welcoming Underground Railroad refugees to Canada and their historic importance to the Black community in the Niagara region:

Puerto Rico

Singapore

United Kingdom

The first Methodist churches were in Norwich (1757), in Rotherham (1761), in Whitby (1762), and in Heptonstall (1764).

About 700 Methodist chapels in the United Kingdom have been identified as significant buildings for their architecture or history by author Ian Serjeant, who has served as Conservation Officer for the Methodist church since 1996.

A list of Methodist churches that are listed buildings was prepared by the U.K. Methodist church's division of property in 1976. A standing committee of the Methodist Church of Britain is charged with having "knowledge of the history, development and use of Methodist chapels, of Methodist liturgy and worship, or archaeology, of the history and the development of architecture and the visual arts, and the experience of the care of historic buildings and their contents", and to advise on about 250 renovation projects per year to the Methodist listed buildings.

John Wesley, the founder of Methodism, is said to have had a preference for octagonal buildings, as exemplified by the Heptonstall Methodist Church in West Yorkshire, England.

Appropriate style for Methodist church buildings was debated during the mid-1800s. Architect-trained Reverend Frederick Jobson argued for "beauty and perfection in design and execution without unnecessary adornment"; the governing body of Methodism adopted his works and Gothic architecture "became the predominant style, particularly within Wesleyan Methodism."

United States
In the United States, numerous Methodist churches are listed on the National Register of Historic Places and on state and local historic registers, many of which reflect the values of plainness, of Gothic architecture, of simple adornment. The Greek Revival style is also simple and came to be adopted for numerous American Methodist churches.

Several, selected significant Methodist churches in the U.S. are:

For a more complete list, see List of Methodist churches in the United States.

References

Methodist churches